California is a Democratic stronghold and considered to be one of the "big three" Democratic strongholds alongside New York and Illinois.

The following table indicates the party of elected officials in the U.S. state of California:
Governor
Lieutenant Governor
Attorney General
Secretary of State
Treasurer
Controller
Insurance Commissioner
California Superintendent of Public Instruction

The table also indicates the historical party composition in the:
Board of Equalization
State Senate
State Assembly
State delegation to the U.S. Senate
State delegation to the U.S. House of Representatives

For years in which a presidential election was held, the table indicates which party's nominees received the state's electoral votes.

Note that ties on the Board of Equalization are broken by the vote of the State Controller.

1849–1990

1991–present

Party strength by number of registrations

Graphical summary

References

See also
Government and politics in California
California locations by voter registration
Politics of California
Politics of California before 1900
Elections in California
Government of California

Politics of California
Government of California
California